The Doe (Wadoe in Swahili) are an ethnic and linguistic group based in northern coastal Tanzania, in the Bagamoyo District and Chalinze District of Pwani Region. In 1987 the Doe population was estimated to number 24,000.

References

Ethnic groups in Tanzania
Indigenous peoples of East Africa